Vermeille may refer to:

Prix Vermeille, French long-distance horse race
Mike Vermeille (born 1992), Swiss ice hockey player

See also
Vermeil (disambiguation)